Pui Fan Lee (born ) is a British-born Chinese actress and presenter. Along with Sue Monroe, Chris Jarvis, and Sidney Sloane she was one of the first presenters on CBeebies, the BBC television channel for younger children. She is known for portraying Po in the original 1997–2001 run of the children's television series Teletubbies, and for presenting the CBeebies preschool education series Show Me Show Me.

Lee's family came from Hong Kong. She was born in Birmingham, and grew up in Nottingham. She moved to London to study drama. She took on the role of Po shortly after leaving Drama school. She was the first presenter, alongside Chris Jarvis to introduce programming on the BBC digital channel CBeebies.

Lee lives in North London.
 
In 2004, Lee had a minor role as a Thai jail girl in the 2004 film Bridget Jones: The Edge of Reason.

In 2006 Lee presented The BBC programme Fun with Phonics.

In 2019, she made a guest appearance in the British soap opera EastEnders.

References

External links
 
 Profile at Blackburn Sachs Associates
 Interview on CBeebies.com
 The Chris and Pui Roadshow website

Living people
English puppeteers
Animal impersonators
British actresses of Chinese descent
English people of Hong Kong descent
English television actresses
English television presenters
20th-century English actresses
21st-century English actresses
Year of birth missing (living people)